SunLine Transit Agency, a transit operator in Riverside County, California (with over 3.5 million passengers a year), is a transit agency providing bus service in the Palm Springs Area, with service extending into San Bernardino Transit Center during peak hours.

History and description 
SunLine Transit Agency (STA) was established under a Joint Powers Agreement, initially between Riverside County and Coachella Valley cities (Coachella, Desert Hot Springs, Indio, Palm Desert, and Palm Springs) on July 1, 1977. Cathedral City, Indian Wells, La Quinta, and Rancho Mirage were added later. Each of the nine member cities selects one member of the SunLine Board of Directors, with the tenth provided by Riverside County.

In addition to its transit operations, SunLine regulates local taxi services (as the SunLine Regulatory Administration, a division of the SunLine Services Group) and sells CNG and hydrogen to the public from dispensers at its Thousand Palms and Indio operations facilities, under the brand SunFuels.

Routes

Destinations 
Destinations served include:

 Agua Caliente Casino
 Agua Caliente Cultural Museum
 National Date Festival Fairgrounds
 Indian Wells Tennis Garden
 Palm Springs Air Museum
 Indio High School
 La Quinta High School
 Palm Desert High School
 Palm Springs High School
 Cathedral City High School
 Rancho Mirage High School
 Desert Memorial Park
 Eisenhower Medical Center
 Westfield Palm Desert
 McCallum Theater
 College of the Desert
 Palm Springs Aerial Tramway
 California State University, San Bernardino
 San Bernardino Transit Center

Governance 
SunLine is governed by a board of directors with 10 members
 1 City Council member From Palm Springs
 1 City Council member from the 9 cities in the Palm Springs Area that are not Palm Springs City.
 1 from the Riverside County Board of Supervisors, that represents the Palm Springs Area (District 4)

Chair

Glenn Miller

Vice Chair

Lisa Middleton

Chief Executive Officer

Lauren Skiver

Facilities and fleet 

The initial fleet included 22 buses in 1977. SunDial paratransit operations started in 1991.
The SunLine Board of Directors adopted a resolution in 1992 to convert their fleet to alternative fuel, and became the first transit agency in the United States to do so in 1994, using compressed natural gas (CNG) buses.

Starting in 2000, SunLine began limited operations with hydrogen fuel cell buses, installing a hydrogen fuel station using a Stuart Energy electrolyzer to supply the XCELLSiS ZEbus for a 13-month trial. The first revenue operations were conducted with the Thor/ISE ThunderPower fuel cell bus, using an ElDorado National EZ-Rider II chassis, between November 2002 to February 2003. By that time, SunLine also had installed a HyRadix methane reformer to generate hydrogen. SunLine tested a hydrogen hybrid internal combustion engine (HHICE) bus in early 2005; the bus was subsequently sent to Winnipeg Transit for cold weather testing.

STA plans to convert their fleet to zero-emission buses (ZEB) by 2035, with only ZEBs purchased starting in 2021. Due to the relatively long fixed routes, the final mix of ZEBs is expected to be mostly hydrogen fuel-cell buses.

SunLine has two operations and maintenance facilities: one (including the administrative offices) in Thousand Palms, and another in Indio. , on-site refueling and charging capabilities include an electrolyzer that can produce  of hydrogen at Thousand Palms, which came online in 2019, and six 80 kW AC/DC battery-electric bus chargers, three each at both Thousand Palms and Indio. Hydrogen dispensers (using delivered liquid ) and additional chargers are planned for both facilities.

Hydrogen production started in November 2000. Two electrolyzers and a natural gas reformer were part of the initial installation. The HyRadix Adéo reformer was installed at the end of 2003.

References

External links 
 Official SunLine Transit Agency website

Public transportation in Riverside County, California
Coachella Valley
Bus transportation in California
Transit agencies in California
Cathedral City, California
Coachella, California
Desert Hot Springs, California
Indio, California
La Quinta, California
Palm Springs, California
Transit authorities with natural gas buses